José Iraragorri Ealo (16 March 1912 – 27 April 1983), nicknamed "Chato", was a Spanish footballer who played as an inside left.

Career

Club
Born in Basauri, Iraragorri initially played for Athletic Bilbao between 1929 and 1936, during which he won La Liga and the Copa del Rey four times each, as well as five regional championships; he was part of a famed forward line with Chirri II, Guillermo Gorostiza, Lafuente and Bata.

His career was interrupted by the Spanish Civil War, and he and his teammates toured Europe as the Basque national side, who then went to Mexico as Club Deportivo Euzkadi.

Iraragorri thereafter moved to Argentina's Club Atlético San Lorenzo de Almagro along with fellow Basques Isidro Lángara and Ángel Zubieta, spending two years in Buenos Aires. He went back to Mexico to play for Real Club España, before finally returning to Spain and Athletic Bilbao from 1946 to 1949.

On retiring as a player aged 37, he immediately became the Athletic manager, remaining in the post for the next three seasons (winning another Cup in 1950); he also coached other clubs for short spells.

International
Iraragorri also played 7 games for the Spain national football team, scoring one goal (two goals according to the official FIFA report) in the 1934 FIFA World Cup match against Brazil.

References

External links
Profile

Athletic Bilbao manager profile

1912 births
1983 deaths
Spanish footballers
Spanish expatriate footballers
Spain international footballers
Footballers from the Basque Country (autonomous community)
1934 FIFA World Cup players
La Liga players
Athletic Bilbao footballers
San Lorenzo de Almagro footballers
Expatriate footballers in Argentina
Expatriate footballers in Mexico
Liga MX players
Spanish football managers
Barakaldo CF managers
Athletic Bilbao managers
Real Valladolid managers
RC Celta de Vigo managers
Hércules CF managers
Real Club España footballers
Spanish expatriate sportspeople in Argentina
Spanish expatriate sportspeople in Mexico
Association football forwards
Basque Country international footballers
Sportspeople from Biscay
People from Basauri